Whinnery is a surname. Notable people with the surname include:

Barbara Whinnery (born 1953), American actress
John Roy Whinnery (1916–2009), American electrical engineer and educator

See also
Whinney